Sir Robert Heatlie Scott,  (20 September 1905 – 26 February 1982) was a British civil servant who became Permanent Secretary of the Ministry of Defence.

Career
Educated at Inverness Academy, Queen's Royal College in Trinidad and New College, Oxford, Scott was called to the bar before joining the civil service in 1927. In 1941, during the Second World War, he sat on the Governor's War Council in Singapore. He was taken prisoner by the Japanese after Singapore was captured and beaten and tortured.

After the war Scott became Assistant Under-Secretary of State at the Foreign Office and then Minister at the British Embassy in Washington D. C. before returning to Singapore as Commissioner-General in 1955. He went on to be Commandant of the Imperial Defence College in 1960 and then Permanent Secretary of the Ministry of Defence in 1961.

In retirement Scott was Lord Lieutenant of Peeblesshire and then Lord Lieutenant of Tweeddale. He lived at Lyne Station House in Peebleshire.

Family
In 1933 Scott married Rosamond Aeliz Dewar-Durie; they had a son and a daughter.

References

1905 births
1982 deaths
Alumni of New College, Oxford
Knights Grand Cross of the Order of St Michael and St George
Commanders of the Order of the British Empire
Alumni of Queen's Royal College, Trinidad
British expatriates in Trinidad and Tobago